Otto Charles Bänninger (24 January 1897 – 15 May 1973) was a Swiss sculptor, born in Zürich.

He married Germaine Richier on 12 December 1929.

"Otto-C.-Bänninger-Weg" in Zürich is named for him.

Works
Knabe mit Pferd, 1939, Schweizerische Landesausstellung in Zürich (destroyed)
Bullinger-Denkmal, 1939–1940, Zürich, Grossmünster
Der Genesende, 1946–48, Zürich, Universitätsspital
Remonte!, 1957, Olten, Aare-Brücke
Bronzeportal, 1957, Schaffhausen, Münster
Reiterstandbild Henri Guisan, 1967, Lausanne-Ouchy

Further reading
 Charles-Albert Cingria: Otto Charles Bänninger. Graphis, Zürich 1949. 
 Franz Müller: Reiner Statuaire. Otto Charles Bänninger – Porträts und Denkmäler. In: Neue Zürcher Zeitung, 18./19. Januar 1997, S. 68.

References

External links

1897 births
1973 deaths
Alumni of the Académie de la Grande Chaumière
20th-century Swiss sculptors
20th-century Swiss male artists